Mukerji is a surname. Notable persons with this name include:

Asoke Kumar Mukerji (born 1955), Indian diplomat and writer
Dhan Gopal Mukerji, Indian writer
Raj Mukerji, New Jersey lobbyist, political consultant and entrepreneur
Rani Mukerji, Bollywood actress
Mukerji of Khanpur, famed 19th century Indian lithotomist
Dr Hozan Mukerji, Specialist Dermatologist, from Iraqi Kurdistan. He took this surname from his immigrant Indian grandfather to Iraq in 1918.

See also 

Mukherjee, popular Bengali surname, alternate spelling